Voronyinsky (masculine), Voronyinskaya (feminine), or Voronyinskoye (neuter) may refer to:
Voronyinskoye Rural Community (1861–1866), a rural community of Kemsky Uyezd, Arkhangelsk Governorate, Russian Empire
Voronyinskaya Volost (1866–1868), a volost of Kemsky Uyezd, Arkhangelsk Governorate, Russian Empire